Charles François Lhomond (1727 – December 31, 1794) was a French priest, grammarian, and educator who was a native of Chaulnes, Somme.

He attended classes at the Collège d'Inville in Paris, where he subsequently became dean of the school. Later on, he spent twenty years as an educator at the Collège du Cardinal-Lemoine in the Latin Quarter of Paris, and afterwards was professor emeritus at the University of Paris.

Lhomond made contributions in the field of education, being the author of several works on grammar, Roman history and religious history. His textbook from 1779, De viris illustribus urbis Romae a Romulo ad Augustum, was still used in the 20th century by French students learning Roman history and Latin.

Other works by Lhomond include:
  (Basics of French Grammar, 1771)
  (Basics of Latin Grammar, 1779)
  (Summary of Sacred History, 1784)
  (Abridged History of the Church)
  (Abridged History of Religion Prior to the Arrival of Jesus Christ)

In 1792 he was jailed for refusing to swear allegiance to the Civil Constitution of the Clergy, but was released shortly afterwards through intervention by Jean-Lambert Tallien (1767–1820), a former student of his at Collège du Cardinal-Lemoine.  A statue of Lhomond by French sculptor Eugène-Louis Lequesne stands in his home town of Chaulnes.

References 
 Epitome Historiae Sacræ (translated biography)

1727 births
1794 deaths
18th-century Latin-language writers
18th-century French male writers
French educators
Grammarians from France
People from Somme (department)